The 28th General Assembly of Nova Scotia represented Nova Scotia between 1882 and 1886.

Angus McGillivray was chosen as speaker for the house.

The assembly was dissolved on May 20, 1886.

List of Members 

Notes:

References 
 

Terms of the General Assembly of Nova Scotia
1882 establishments in Nova Scotia
1886 disestablishments in Nova Scotia
19th century in Nova Scotia